Oberbootsmann (OBtsm or in lists OB) designates in the German Navy of the Bundeswehr a military person or member of the armed forces. It belongs to the particular rank group Senior NCOs with port epée.

According to the salary class it is equivalent to the Oberfeldwebel of Heer or Luftwaffe. It is grouped as OR6 in NATO, equivalent to First Sergeant, Master Sergeant, or Senior Chief Petty Officer in the US Armed forces, and to Warrant Officer Class 2 in the British Army and Royal Navy.

In navy context NCOs of this rank were formally addressed as Herr Oberbootsmann also informally / short  Oberbootsmann.

The sequence of ranks (top-down approach) in that particular group is as follows:
Unteroffiziere mit Portepee
OR-9: Oberstabsbootsmann / Oberstabsfeldwebel
OR-8: Stabsbootsmann / Stabsfeldwebel 
OR-7: Hauptbootsmann and Oberfähnrich zur See/ and Hauptfeldwebel and Oberfähnrich
OR-6a: Oberbootsmann/ Oberfeldwebel 
OR-6b: Bootsmann and Fähnrich zur See/ Feldwebel and Fähnrich

Equivalent in other NATO countries 
  – Premier-maître chef/ Eerste meester
  – Chief petty officer 2nd class/ Premier maître de 2e classe
  – Stožerni narednik
  – Seniorsergent
  – Premier maître
  – Επικελευστής/ Epikelefstis
  – Petty officer/specialist (after 6 years service)
  – secondo capo scelto
  – Sergeant-majoor
  – no equivalent
  – Młodszy chorąży marynarki
  – Sargento-ajudante
  – Sargento primero
  – Chief Petty Officer/ Colour Sergeant
  – Chief Petty Officer/ Gunnery Sergeant

|-
|width="30%" align="center" rowspan="2"  style="background:#cfcfcf;" |junior RankBootsmann
|width="40%" align="center" rowspan="2" style="background:#bfbfbf;" | Oberbootsmann
|width="30%" align="center" rowspan="1" style="background:#afafaf;" |senior RankHauptbootsmannOberfähnrich zur See

See also
 Ranks of the German Bundeswehr
 Rank insignia of the German Bundeswehr

References

Naval ranks of Germany